Flicksville is a village located in Northampton County, Pennsylvania.

It is part of Washington Township. Flicksville previously had a post office with a ZIP Code of 18050; however, this ZIP Code was retired in 2016 and the community is now served by the Bangor ZIP Code of 18013.

Geography
Flicksville is located at  (40.8442630,-75.2015672). It lies few km in south of the borough of Bangor and is crossed by the river Martins Creek.

Public education
The village is served by the Bangor Area School District.

References

Populated places established in 1865
Unincorporated communities in Northampton County, Pennsylvania
Unincorporated communities in Pennsylvania